Mountain of Love is a dubtronica act from Brixton in London, England. The band was set up by two of the founding members of Alabama 3, Piers Marsh and Sir Eddie Real in 2011. They released their first self titled album in 2012 on the Cooked Griffin Records label.

History
After Mountain of Love members Piers and Eddie wrote the Alabama 3 song and The Sopranos theme tune "Woke Up This Morning", they left the band to make heavy dubbed, groove based dance music. After the band was formed in 2011, they began to write and produce their first self titled album which was released on 2 August 2012.

Members
Piers Marsh
Sir Eddie Real

Discography
Mountain of Love

External links
 

English electronic music groups
Dubtronica musicians
Musical groups from the London Borough of Lambeth